"Just Pretend" is a 1970 song by Elvis Presley.

Writing 
It was composed by Guy Fletcher in partnership with his writing partner Doug Flett.

Recording 
Elvis Presley recorded it on June 6, 1970 as part of his July 4–8 studio sessions for RCA at RCA's Studio B in Nashville, Tennessee.

Personnel
Elvis Presley – lead vocals, acoustic rhythm guitar
James Burton – lead guitar
Chip Young – rhythm guitar
Charlie Hodge – acoustic rhythm guitar
Norbert Putnam – bass
David Briggs – piano
Jerry Carrigan – drums
Charlie McCoy – marimba

Release history 
The song was first released on Presley's album That's the Way It Is that appeared on November 11, 1970.

Critical response 
Robert Matthew-Walker in his 1995 book Heartbreak Hotel: The Life and Music of Elvis Presley calls the song "massive, slow and uninspired":

2016 version with the Royal Philharmonic Orchestra 
In 2016, the song appeared on the album The Wonder of You: Elvis Presley with the Royal Philharmonic Orchestra, which included new versions of Presley's songs, reworked and dubbed with the Royal Philharmonic Orchestra. There were two versions of the song: Presley's solo version and his duet with Helene Fischer.

References

External links 
 

1970 songs
Elvis Presley songs
Songs written by Guy Fletcher (songwriter)
Songs written by Doug Flett